Hazar Merd is a group of Paleolithic cave sites excavated by Dorothy Garrod in 1928. The caves are located south-southwest of Sulaymaniyah in Sulaymaniyah Governorate in Iraq. Garrod's soundings in two caves in the Hazar Merd group provided evidence of Middle and Epi-Paleolithic occupation.The Dark cave or Ashkawty Tarik in Kurdish has a commanding view of the local valley and is close to a small spring and a village with the same name.

Dark Cave has a single lofty chamber 11 by 12 m wide. The Mousterian layer, level C, is over 3 m thick, containing many hearths and burnt flints and bones. The stone tool assemblage, of flint and chert, is dominated by side scrapers and Mousterian points, with no evidence of the Levallois technique. In the lowest reaches of level C, but still within Mousterian layers, two hand-axes were found. Side-scrapers slightly decrease in popularity towards the top of level C.

The faunal assemblage, although fragmentary, again shows a completely modem aspect, with bones from wild goat, red deer, gazelle, field mouse, mole rat, hare, bat and several birds of woodland and scrub habitat. This evidence, and that from the presence of snails of the species Helix salomonica, indicates a mixed environment of woodland, grassland and scrub, much as exists today. A smaIl sounding in the adjacent Water Cave also revealed evidence of Mousterian occupation.

Garrod did not keep all the excavated material and she only kept those pieces that were topologically informative. Remaining pieces were thrown away at the site.

Hazar Merd and Shanidar Cave are the only excavated Middle Palaeolithic sites in Iraqi Kurdistan.

References

 Garrod, D.A.E. (1930): The Palaeolithic of Southern Kurdistan: Excavations in the Caves of Zarzi and Hazar Merd. Bulletin of the American School of Prehistoric Research, No. 6, pp. 9–43.
 Matthews, R.J.,(2000) The Early Prehistory of Mesopotamia 500000 to 4500 bc. Subartu V
 Davies, W. and Charles, R. (eds) (1999) Dorothy Garrod and the Progress of the Palaeolithic: Studies in the Prehistoric Archaeology of the Near East and Europe. Oxford: Oxbow Books.

External links
 

1928 archaeological discoveries
Sulaymaniyah Governorate
Paleolithic sites
Neanderthal sites
Archaeological sites in Iraq
Former populated places in Iraq
Mousterian